David Klahr (born 1939) is an American psychologist whose research ranges across the fields of cognitive development, psychology of science, and educational psychology and has been a professor at Carnegie Mellon University since 1969. He is the Walter van Dyke Bingham Professor of Cognitive Development and Education Sciences at Carnegie Mellon University and a member of the National Academy of Education, a Fellow of the American Psychological Association, a Charter Fellow of the Association for Psychological Science, on the Governing Board of the Cognitive Development Society, a member of the Society for Research in Child Development, and the Cognitive Science Society. He was an associate editor of Developmental Psychology and has served on the editorial boards of several cognitive science journals, as well as on the National Science Foundation's subcommittee on Memory and Cognitive Processes, and the National Institutes of Health's Human Development and Aging Study Section.

He has served on three committees of the National Research Council: the Committee on Foundations of Educational Assessment (Knowing What Students Know, National Academies Press, 2001), the Committee on Research in Education (Advancing Scientific Research in Education, National Academies Press, 2004) and the Committee on Science Learning (Taking Science to School: Learning and Teaching Science in Grades K–8, National Academies Press, 2007). He also serves as member of the advisory board for the Brain, Mind & Behavior Program of the James S. McDonnell Foundation.

Life

He received his undergraduate degree from MIT in electrical engineering (1960), and his Ph.D. in 1968 from Carnegie Mellon's Graduate School of Industrial Administration ("GSIA", now the Tepper School of Business) in Organizations and Social Behavior. From 1966 to 1969, he was an assistant professor at the University of Chicago with joint appointments in the School of Business and the Department of Mathematics. In 1968–69 was a visiting research fellow at the University of Stirling, Scotland, and a visiting Fulbright lecturer at the London School of Business. He returned to Carnegie Mellon University with joint appointment in GSIA and psychology in 1969, and became professor of psychology in 1976. He served as head of the Psychology Department from 1983 to 1993, and is currently director of the Program in Interdisciplinary Education Research (PIER), a doctoral training grant funded by the Office of Education.

Scientific contributions

Throughout his career, Klahr has focused on the analysis of complex cognitive processes in such diverse areas as voting behavior, college admissions, consumer choice, peer review, problem solving and scientific reasoning. He pioneered the application of information processing analysis to questions of cognitive development, and, in collaboration with Iain Wallace, formulated the first computer simulation models to account for children's performance on a variety of Piagetian tasks and other types of problems.

Dr. Klahr's most recent research has investigated the cognitive processes that support children's understanding of the fundamental principles underlying scientific thinking. This work includes both basic research with pre-school children and more applied classroom studies of how to improve the teaching of experimental science in elementary school. He has worked in a wide variety of schools in the Pittsburgh region, focusing on the relative effectiveness of different instructional methods for teaching children how to design and interpret simple experiments

Bibliography

 1966. A computer simulation of the paradox of voting, American Political Science Review, LX, 384–390
 1976. (with J. G. Wallace). Cognitive Development: An Information-Processing View
 1988. (with Kevin Dunbar). Dual space search during scientific reasoning, Cognitive Science, 12(1), 1–48
 2000. Exploring Science: The Cognition and Development of Discovery Processes, Cambridge, MA: MIT Press

References

External links

 The 37th Carnegie Symposium on Cognition: From Child to Scientist: Mechanisms of Learning and Development; A Festschrift in honor of the scientific and educational contributions of David Klahr
4Researchers.org lectures by David Klahr
David Klahr's CMU web page
David Klahr's personal web page

Carnegie Mellon University faculty
Tepper School of Business alumni
American cognitive scientists
American educational psychologists
Living people
1939 births
Fellows of the American Psychological Association